Up in Mabel's Room is a play written by Wilson Collison and Otto Hauerbach. Producer Albert H. Woods staged it on Broadway in 1919.

Plot
Garry Ainsworth is married to Geraldine, who is jealous of his previous relationship with a pretty young widow, Mabel Essington. When they were together, Garry gave Mabel a chemise with their names embroidered on it. He wants to recover the garment before Geraldine learns of its existence. Garry's efforts are interpreted by other characters as evidence of a tryst between him and Mabel, leading to a confrontation between Mabel and Geraldine before the misunderstanding is resolved.

Cast and characters
The characters and cast from the Broadway production are given below:

History
The play opened at the Eltinge 42nd Street Theatre on January 15, 1919. It closed in August 1919 after 229 performances.

Adaptations
The play was adapted twice as a movie. A 1926 silent film adaptation starred Marie Prevost as Mabel. A 1944 film adaptation starred Marjorie Reynolds.

References

External links

 

1919 plays
American plays adapted into films
Broadway plays
Comedy plays
Plays by Wilson Collison
Plays by Otto Harbach